Sodium sulfate symporters are integral membrane proteins that mediate the intake of a wide variety of molecules with the concomitant uptake of sodium ions. These sodium symporters can be grouped, on the basis of sequence and functional similarities into a number of distinct families. One of these families, also known as SLC13 transporters, consists of the following proteins:

Mammalian sodium/sulphate cotransporter.
Mammalian renal sodium/dicarboxylate cotransporter, which transports succinate and citrate.
Mammalian intestinal sodium/dicarboxylate cotransporter.
 Chlamydomonas reinhardtii putative sulphur deprivation response regulator SAC1.

This family also includes a number of bacterial symporters.

References

Protein families
Solute carrier family